Jermaine Sandvliet (born 17 September 1977 in Rotterdam) is a Dutch footballer who played for Dutch club FC Dordrecht in the Eerste Divisie from 1997 to 2004.

He signed for Drogheda United in July 2004

In his last game he helped Drogheda win the 2005 FAI Cup

Honours
Drogheda United
 FAI Cup (1): 2005

References

External links
 
 

Dutch footballers
Footballers from Rotterdam
Association football midfielders
1977 births
FC Dordrecht players
Dutch sportspeople of Surinamese descent
Living people
Drogheda United F.C. players
Eerste Divisie players
League of Ireland players
BVV Barendrecht players